Ein Qiniyye or 'Ayn Qunya is a Druze village in the Israeli-occupied southern foothills of Mount Hermon, 750 meters above sea level. It was granted local council status in 1982. Its inhabitants are mostly Syrian citizens with permanent residency status in Israel (for more about the status and position of the Golan Heights Druze community see here).

History 
Ein Qiniyye is one of the four remaining Druze-Syrian communities on the Israeli-occupied side of Mount Hermon and the Golan Heights, together with Majdal Shams, Mas'ade and Buq'ata. Geographically a distinction is made between the Golan Heights and Mount Hermon, the boundary being marked by the Sa'ar Stream; however, administratively usually they are lumped together. Ein Qiniyye and Majdal Shams are on the Hermon side of the boundary, thus sitting on limestone, while Buq'ata and Mas'ade are on the Golan side, characterised by black volcanic rock (basalt).
 
Since the adoption of the 1981 Golan Heights Law, Ein Qiniyye is under Israeli civil law, and incorporated into the Israeli system of local councils. Some of the young people of the village used to study at Syrian universities, but at the end of 2012 a Druze cleric advised them against applying until the Syrian Civil War was over. Most of the town's residents are Druze, but a few Christians remain of a much larger community that left the town in the 1940s and 1950s.

Sister City
 Great Neck, New York, USA (2022)

References

External links

Populated places in Quneitra Governorate
Populated places in the Golan Heights
Local councils in Northern District (Israel)
Druze communities in Syria
Christian communities in Syria
Villages in Syria
14th-century establishments in the Mamluk Sultanate